The 2017 NFL Draft was the 82nd annual meeting of National Football League (NFL) franchises to select newly eligible American football players. It was held in front of the Philadelphia Museum of Art on April 27–29, returning to Philadelphia for the first time since 1961.

The player selections were announced from an outdoor theater built on the Rocky Steps, marking the first time an entire NFL draft was held outdoors. The NFL announced that the draft was the most attended in history, with more than 250,000 people present. Starting with this draft, compensatory picks could be traded. The record for most trades made during an NFL Draft was set this year at 37, surpassing the 34 trades in the 2008 NFL Draft. The number of trades was surpassed in 2019, when 40 were conducted.

Early entrants

The deadline for underclassmen to declare for the draft was January 16, 2017.

The following is the breakdown of the 253 players selected by position:

 34 Cornerbacks 
 32 Wide receivers
 29 Linebackers
 26 Running backs
 26 Defensive ends
 23 Safeties
 20 Defensive tackles
 16 Offensive tackles
 14 Tight ends
 11 Offensive guards
 10 Quarterbacks
 6 Centers
 3 Placekickers
 3 Fullbacks
 1 Long snapper

Player selections

Notable undrafted players

Summary

Selections by college athletic conference
The SEC led all conferences for the 11th year in a row with 53 selections.

Schools with multiple draft selections

Michigan and Alabama set school records to lead the country with 11 and 10 picks respectively, marking the 2nd consecutive year a Big Ten school had the most.

Selections by position

Notes

Trades
In the explanations below, (PD) indicates trades completed prior to the start of the draft (i.e. Pre-Draft), while (D) denotes trades that took place during the 2017 draft. Please note that this is the first year where teams are allowed to trade compensatory picks.

Round one

Round two

Round three

Round four

Round five

Round six

Round seven

Forfeited/penalized picks

References
Trade references

General references

National Football League Draft
NFL Draft
Draft
NFL Draft
American football in Philadelphia
NFL draft
Events in Philadelphia